Victor Gheorghiu (born 24 June 1992) is a Moldovan international footballer playing for FC Milsami.

Club statistics
Total matches played in Moldavian First League: 34 matches - 0 goals

References

External links

1992 births
Moldovan footballers
Living people
Association football defenders
FC Milsami Orhei players